Thunder in the East is the fifth studio album by Japanese heavy metal band Loudness, and the first released by a major American label after the contract signed with Atco Records, then a subsidiary of Atlantic Records. Aside from being the band's first all-English release, it is the first Loudness album produced by Max Norman, best known for his previous work with Ozzy Osbourne, who also produced Lightning Strikes in 1986 and Soldier of Fortune in 1989. Thunder in the East features the single "Crazy Nights", the band's biggest hit in America, and the power ballad "Never Change Your Mind". This album marked the first time a Japanese band entered the US Top 100 chart, where it remained for 23 weeks, peaking at No. 74.

The album cover introduced the band's signature logo, which would be used in majority of their discography. The Rising Sun background would also be used in the band's albums Breaking the Taboo and The Sun Will Rise Again. The 2005 remastered version includes the bonus tracks "Gotta Fight" and "Odin", which were originally released as singles for the 1985 anime film Odin: Photon Sailer Starlight.

The chant of "M-Z-A!" featured in the single "Crazy Nights" came about when producer Norman asked lead vocalist Niihara to come up with something to sing over the main riff between the chorus and next verse. "M-Z-A!" means nothing, and it was intended to be replaced with another line in post-production. When Niihara could not come up with anything to replace it, the "M-Z-A!" chant survived.

In 2017, the album was re-released on limited edition red vinyl.

Track listing
All lyrics by Minoru Niihara and all music by Akira Takasaki, except "Heavy Chains" lyrics and music by Masayoshi Yamashita.

2005 remastered CD edition bonus tracks

Personnel
Band members
 Minoru Niihara – vocals
 Akira Takasaki – guitars
 Masayoshi Yamashita – bass
 Munetaka Higuchi – drums

Production
 Max Norman – producer
 Bill Freesh – engineer
 Ray Leonard – assistant engineer
 Bernie Grundman – mastering
 Paul Cooper – executive producer
 George Azuma – supervisor
 Hiroyuki Munekiyo, Mikio Shimizu – coordinators

References

Loudness (band) albums
1985 albums
Albums produced by Max Norman
Atco Records albums
Nippon Columbia albums
Music for Nations albums
Albums recorded at Sound City Studios